Travancore is a former kingdom in India.

Travancore may also refer to:

 Travancore, Victoria, a suburb in Australia 
 Travancore royal family, the royal family of Travancore 
 Travancore sisters, a South Indian entertainment group active in the 1940s–60s

See also 
 Travancore–Cochin, Indian state from 1949 to 1956